Puddington is a civil parish in Cheshire West and Chester, England. It contains 12 buildings that are recorded in the National Heritage List for England as designated listed buildings.  Of these, one is listed at Grade II*, the middle grade, and the others are at Grade II.  Apart from the village of Puddington, the parish is entirely rural.  Nine of the listed buildings are houses, or structures related to houses or farming, the other three being footpath guideposts.  All of these were erected by the Wirral Footpaths Preservation Society towards the end of the 19th century, or at the beginning of the 20th century.  They all bear an inscription on the shaft.

Key

Buildings

References
Citations

Sources

Listed buildings in Cheshire West and Chester
Lists of listed buildings in Cheshire